This page list topics related to Syria.



0-9

A
Aleppo
Alejandro Hamed
al-Assad, Hafez
al-Assad, Bashar

B
Baath Dam
Ba'ath Party
Battle of Maysalun

C
Christianity in Syria
Cities and towns during the Syrian civil war
Communications in Syria
COVID-19 pandemic in Syria
Cuisine of Syria

D
Damascus
Demographics of Syria
Discover Syria Rally
Districts of Syria

E
Ebla
Economy of Syria
Education in Syria

F
Foreign relations of Syria
Freedom of religion in Syria
French Mandate of Syria

G
Geography of Syria
Golan Heights
Governorates of Syria
Greater Syria

H
Hama
Hatay Province
Health in Syria
Hisham Ikhtiyar
History of Syria
Homs
Human rights in Syria

I
Islam in Syria

J

K

L
Lake Assad
Latakia
List of castles in Syria
List of cities in Syria
List of diplomatic missions in Syria
List of diplomatic missions of Syria
List of mammals of Syria
List of museums in Syria
List of people from Latakia
Literature of Syria

M
Military of Syria
Music of Syria

N
Name of Syria
National Progressive Front

O
Outline of Syria

P
Palmyra
Parliament of Syria
Politics of Syria
Public holidays in Syria

Q

R
Religion in Syria

S
Scouts of Syria
Shebaa farms
Syria – United States relations
Syrian Arab Republic
Syrian civil war
Syrian Communist Party
Syrian Desert
Syrian Revolution
Syrian Social Nationalist Party
Syrian towns and villages depopulated in the Arab-Israeli conflict

T
Tabqa Dam
Transport in Syria

U
United States Ambassador to Syria

V
Syria-Venezuela Relations

W
Water resources management in Syria
Water supply and sanitation in Syria

X

Y

Z

See also
Lists of country-related topics - similar lists for other countries
Syrian News - Syrian News

Lists
List of Syrians

Syria